Taliesin was a 6th-century Welsh poet and bard.

Taliesin may also refer to:

Book of Taliesin, a medieval Welsh manuscript containing poetry attributed to the bard
Taliesin (studio), a studio of Frank Lloyd Wright in Spring Green, Wisconsin
Taliesin Junior School, a school in Shotton, Flintshire, Wales
Taliesin Orchestra, an orchestra that specializes in remaking famous songs into orchestral melodies
The Book of Taliesyn, an album by Deep Purple
Taliesin, a Fairlie locomotive owned by the Ffestiniog railway
Taliesin, a 1987 novel in The Pendragon Cycle by Stephen R. Lawhead

People with the given name
Taliesin Jaffe, American voice actor and director
Taliesin Selley, Welsh rugby player

See also
Taliesin West, Frank Lloyd Wright's studio in Scottsdale, Arizona, USA
Tre-Taliesin, a village in Ceredigion, Wales, UK